The Mercedes-Benz OC 500 LE is a modular, heavy-duty, twin-axle bus chassis produced by Mercedes-Benz/EvoBus Ibérica, Spain. It was designed as a modular platform for low-entry city, suburban, and intercity buses with a maximum gross vehicle weight of 19.1 tonnes. The main modules consist of: driver's pedestal, front axle, buggy centre section, drive axle and engine. It has much in common with the chassis used for the Mercedes-Benz Citaro integral bus range, and also the raised floor OC 500 RF coach chassis. The engine is horizontally mounted over the rear overhang.

Mercedes-Benz in Brazil manufacture a low-entry chassis known as the O 500 U, which is related to the OC 500 LE, but is not identical. It is also available as the articulated O 500 UA and the quad-axle articulated O 500 UDA, with the latter giving a vehicle length of 23 metres. The O 500 U is also available in Australia, marketed as OH1830LE.

Technical details

Variations
OC 500 LE 1825h
 Engine type: OM 457 hLA (Euro III) inline 6-cylinder 11.967-litre turbocharged intercooled, direct injection diesel
 Power: 185 kW (252 hp) @ 2000 rpm
 Torque: 1100 N m (811 ft·lbf) @ 1100 rpm

OC 500 LE 1825hG
Engine type: M 447 hLAG (Euro IV/Euro V/EEV) inline 6-cylinder 11.967-litre turbocharged intercooled, lean burn, spark ignition single point injection CNG
Power: 185 kW (252 hp) @ 2000 rpm
Torque: 1050 N m (774 ft·lbf) @ 1000-1400 rpm

OC 500 LE 1830h
Engine type: OM 457 hLA (Euro III/Euro IV/Euro V/EEV) inline 6-cylinder 11.967-litre turbocharged intercooled, direct injection diesel
Power: 220 kW (299 hp) @ 2000 rpm
Torque: 1250 N m (921 ft·lbf) @ 1100 rpm

OC 500 LE Euro VI
Engine type: OM 936 (Euro VI) inline 6-cylinder 7.698-litre turbocharged intercooled, direct injection diesel
Power: 220 kW (299 hp) @ 1200 rpm
Torque: 1200 N m @ 1200-1600 rpm

Initially available with Euro III engines, the OC 500 LE chassis got upgraded to Euro IV, Euro V and EEV-compliant diesel engines using AdBlue Selective Catalytic Reduction technology. With Euro IV, Euro V and EEV, the 252 hp rating of the OM 457 hLA was discontinued, making the 299 hp engine as standard for the OC 500 LE. It is also available with the OM 936 engine in Euro VI markets.

Transmissions
Currently, Mercedes-Benz only offers a ZF EcoLife 6-speed automatic transmission with integrated hydraulic retarder (model 6 AP 1200 B for the 252 hp CNG engine or model 6 AP 1400 B for the 299 hp diesel engine).  Previously available was the Voith D864.3E 4-speed automatic transmission as well as the ZF Ecomat 5 HP 502/592 5-speed and 6 HP 502/592 6-speed automatic transmissions.

Orders

Australia

Large numbers of buses built on the OC 500 LE chassis can be found in Australia, where it was originally marketed as the O 500LE. then got renamed as the Mercedes OC 500 LE . Now, it is marketed here like in the world, as OC 500 LE.

Transperth operate 540 Volgren bodied examples, 474 being CNG powered. There have been 15 OC 500 LE CNG fires in Perth, and in October 2013, the Public Transport Authority commenced legal action against Mercedes-Benz, Evobus and Volgren. The action was dropped in 2014.

Sydney Buses purchased 255 CNG and 20 diesel powered examples, all with Custom Coaches bodies, however one was destroyed by fire in June 2011. The Custom O500LE is powered by a 185 kW and 1050Nm CNG M 447 hLAG inline 11.967 litre 6-cylinder engine.

There are two gas tanks (indicated by two CNG stickers on number plate) located on top of the bus near the front. Metal pipes run on the offside roof to the back of the bus. Because the gas tanks are in the front, the air conditioning unit is placed at the rear of the roof. The gas tank placement is counter-intuitive, but this is due to the various weight requirements imposed by the RMS.

Other purchasers included Ventura Bus Lines (72), Brisbane Transport (40), Premier Illawarra (38), Kefford Corporation (19) and Darwin Bus Service (14).

Many operators across Australia have now purchased the OC 500 LE in various configurations. Problems related to quality control and unreliable electronics have not been uncommon. A lot of these complaints have come from drivers due to some units being under-powered, uncomfortable or rough.

Brisbane Transport withdrew its OC 500 LEs from the fleet for a short period because of a major unidentified fault which caused buses to suddenly accelerate without warning. This problem was fixed by Mercedes-Benz and these vehicles are now back on the road. However, as they were under lease from Mercedes-Benz, their lease expired in 2013 and were then sold to Transit Systems NSW where they currently operate.

In January 2009, Mercedes-Benz Australia issued a recall on 443 CNG-fuelled OC 500 LE units due to respecified welding specifications for the turbocharger oil supply pipe.

Singapore

SMRT Buses

SMRT Buses had taken delivery of 134 Mercedes-Benz OC500LEs for fleet replacement and expansion. These buses feature bodywork built by Gemilang Coachworks of Malaysia and assembled by Thonburi Busbody Limited of Thailand, with a CapaCity licensed front from Mercedes-Benz, engines that meet Euro V emissions standards and are SMRT's first wheelchair accessible buses (WABs). They were the first to feature voice announcement system, with announcements similar to the ones used on the MRT. They are also the first buses in South-East Asia to be fitted with a Euro V engine. The last bus to be registered, SMB134H, was registered on 1 October 2009.

Demonstrator
The first OC500LE took part in the launch of SMRT's Go Green event on 30 April 2008. The bus was later registered as SMB1H and initially entered revenue service on Service 190 on 29 June 2008. It was later redeployed to operate on Service 172, only half a year into service. It is currently used as a Kranji Bus Depot (KJDEP) training bus with a new design of EZ-Link card readers installed.

First production batch
The batch were registered in the ranges of SMB2E to SMB67T. The first few units of this batch were put to service from 22 September 2008 onwards.

Second production batch
The second production batch featured many more differences as compared to its first batch counterparts, most notably its interior. Blue as well as purple colour schemes were used on the seats in contrast to the first batch's corporate colour seats. Stickers greeting onboard passengers can be found at the front and the rear of the bus. A blue tint situated on the top of the windscreen below the Electronic Destination System reduces glare from the sun, and more grab poles and aircon outlets were added at the last few rows of seats.

They were registered from SMB68R till SMB134H. The first few units commenced passenger service on 1 July 2009, almost a year to the day the first unit of the OC500LE (SMB1H) made its first trip. They can be mostly found on WAB-certified services, similar to the first production batch.

SMB91Y is installed with Mobitec MobiLED EDS replacing its original EDS, LAWO BENEFIT EDS due to accident in January 2012.

Tower Transit
In March 2021, Tower Transit took over 1 OC500LE from SMRT Buses in preparation for the takeover of Sembawang-Yishun Bus Package. Tower Transit took over more units as part of the transition in September 2021.

United Kingdom

Small numbers of OC 500 LEs bodied by MCV have entered service in the United Kingdom. The first bus was unveiled in March 2010, and was also exhibited at IAA Hanover 2010. A number have been purchased by Carousel Buses for use to and from Heathrow Airport for express services.

Norway
In 2004, Vest Busscar bodied nine OC 500 LE 1825h with its Center L bodywork for Nettbuss. One was used in the Østfold region, while the other eight entered city traffic in Kristiansund. All eight OC 500 LEs in Kristiansund were exported in 2014, with some of them appearing in Estonia. No other OC 500 LE have been bodied, nor imported to Norway.

Portugal
 Irmãos Mota Atomic UR2000, UR2005, UR2011, URB2014 and Urbis
 Marcopolo Viale

Serbia
Ikarbus IK-112LE, in production as of September 2015, used in Belgrade urban and suburban bus system. Ikarbus offers 2 versions, with 2 or 3 sets of doors.
More than 60 is produced. 
Ikarbus offers suburban version with softer anti-vandal seats and a place for hand luggage.

Spain
 Unvi Urbis
 Hispano Habit
 Hispano Intea
 Burillo
 Sunsundegui Astral
 Castrosúa Magnus
 Noge Intertouring
 Noge Cittour LE

Israel 
Egged ordered OC 500 LE chassis bodied by Merkavim Pioneer and Haargaz Epsilon LE.

References

External links

OC 500 LE
Bus chassis
Low-entry buses
Buses of Germany